Calceolaria dilatata is a species of plant in the Calceolariaceae family. It is endemic to Ecuador.

References

dilatata
Endemic flora of Ecuador
Vulnerable plants
Taxonomy articles created by Polbot